Margaret Pearse (1857–1932) was an Irish politician.

Margaret Pearse may also refer to:

Margaret Mary Pearse (1878–1968), Irish politician, daughter of Margaret Pearse

See also
Margaret Pearce
Margaret Pierce (disambiguation)